Hat Island is an island in Green Bay in Door County, Wisconsin. The island is part of the Town of Egg Harbor, and lies offshore from the community of Juddville. Hat Island is privately owned.

Diagram

References

External links 
 Hat Island, Web-Map of Door County, Wisconsin
 Hat Island, Wisconsin (Fig. 55) in Flora and Vegetation of the Grand Traverse Islands (Lake Michigan), Wisconsin and Michigan by Emmet J. Judziewicz, The Michigan Botanist, Volume 40, Number 4, October 2001, page 120
 Figure 15. Hat Island, in Colonial birds nesting on man-made and natural sites in the U.S. Great Lakes by William C. Scharf, Northwestern Michigan College, Traverse City, Michigan, published by Vicksburg, MS: Waterways Experiment Station, 1978

Islands of Door County, Wisconsin
Lake islands of Wisconsin
Islands of Lake Michigan in Wisconsin
Private islands of Wisconsin
Private islands of the Great Lakes